Xenostylus sublineatus is a species of beetle in the family Cerambycidae, the only species in the genus Xenostylus.

References

Acanthocinini